Aqeeq, akik or aqiq means quartz in Arabic, and agate in Turkish, however in the context of rings usually refers to a ring set with a chalcedony stone. Well-known types of chalcedony are carnelian, agate, and onyx. It is considered a semi-precious gem stone, and rings set with golden-orange variety of carnelian or sard have special significance in the Islamic religion.

Jewellery preparation 
A stone is ground into shape (often a cabochon or a short, wide cylinder) and polished to a shine. Sometimes the flat surface is engraved with a religious motto in Arabic, which is sometimes inlaid with gold. The finished gem is then mounted on a ring according to the stones finished size. Both men and women wear aqiq rings as jewellery.

Islamic significance 
An aqiq ring also has religious importance in Islam as it is considered sunnah to wear one. The prophet Muhammad wore a carnelian / aqiq ring set with silver as a commemoration of the removal of idols from the Grand Mosque in Mecca in 630 CE. To this day many Muslims do the same, including both Shia and Sunni clergy.

Gallery

References

Agates